Next Entertainment World (Korean: 넥스트엔터테인먼트월드, Acronym: NEW) is a South Korean media content production and distribution company. The film investment and distribution business was founded in 2008 by former Showbox president Kim Woo-taek. NEW has since evolved into a comprehensive entertainment company with subsidiaries venturing into other industries including music, sports, production, management, international distribution, and cinema.

History 
Domeo Holdings was the name of the holding company established in 2008. In 2012, it changed its name after a merger through absorption with the wholly owned subsidiary Next Entertainment World. The music distribution corporation Music&NEW was established in 2012. In 2013, global distribution corporation Contents Panda was established. In 2014, Huace Media Group invested $52.7 million, and NEW was listed on KOSDAQ. In 2015, NEW set up sports corporation Bravo&NEW and Korea-China joint venture Huace&NEW. 2016 marked the establishment of contents production corporation Studio&NEW. The Cine Q movie theater branch opened in 2017. In 2019, NEW established VFX company eNgine and digital contents business New ID.

Business

Movie&NEW 

Movie&NEW (stylized in all caps) is NEW's film investment, distribution, marketing, and public relations division. Notable distributed works include Miracle in Cell No. 7, The Attorney, Train to Busan, The Villainess, and Peninsula.

In March 2021, NEW's film division signed a three-year contract with Hollywood investment company Library Pictures International.

Music&NEW 

Music&NEW (stylized in all caps) is the music production, management, and distribution business.

Studio&NEW 

Studio&NEW (stylized in all caps) is a film and drama media content production company that has also expanded to management. Notable productions include the 2016 premiere project Descendants of the Sun and The Great Battle. The studio has attracted more than ₩56 billion (USD$47 million) in investment within five years of establishment.

In April 2021, Studio&NEW signed a five-year contract with OTT streaming service Disney+ with a commitment of supplying at least one project per year. Local media named Moving, a live adaptation of Kang Full's webtoon, and Star original series Rookie Cops as shows that are in the works.

Others 
Source:
 Bravo&NEW focuses on sports broadcasting rights distribution, athlete management, and event planning.
 Cine Q is NEW's movie theater brand.
 Contents Panda handles global copyright distribution and has distributed more than 660 works. Efforts are being made to sign overseas remakes.
 eNgine provides visual effects services and has signed business agreements with 3D graphics companies Wysiwyg Studios and Vive Studios. 
 New ID is the digital content or platform subsidiary. It has partnered with global content platforms such as Samsung Electronics, LG Electronics, Vizio, Amazon, and Roku to launch digital broadcasting channels. It has also partnered with major broadcasters such as MBC Plus, KBS World, SBS Contents Hub, YG Entertainment, Starship Entertainment, and SK Telecom to provide solutions to export Korean wave content.

References

External links 
 

 
Mass media companies established in 2008
Mass media companies of South Korea
Film distributors of South Korea
Film production companies of South Korea
Television production companies of South Korea
Companies based in Seoul
Companies listed on KOSDAQ
Sports management companies
Talent agencies of South Korea
South Korean companies established in 2008
South Korean brands